The Helicarrier is a fictional flying aircraft carrier appearing in American comic books published by Marvel Comics. Created by Stan Lee and Jack Kirby, it first appeared in Strange Tales #135 (August 1965). It is depicted as the crucial mobile command center, forward operations platform, and signature capital ship of the fictional intelligence/defense agency S.H.I.E.L.D. The Helicarrier concept has survived multiple redesigns while rarely straying from its originally depicted role as a mobile headquarters of S.H.I.E.L.D. until recent years.

History
In the Marvel Universe context of the various Nick Fury/S.H.I.E.L.D. series, the original design is attributed to a co-operative effort by Tony Stark, the mutant inventor Forge, and Reed Richards. According to one account in Amazing Fantasy vol. 2, #10, the first Helicarrier was proposed by Stark Industries as a political compromise among the signatories of the treaty in response to fears that any nation hosting the Directorate's main headquarters would be subject to attack by organizations such as HYDRA, with domestic political fallout sure to follow immediately thereafter.

Over twenty Helicarriers have been built over the decades, and at least two have been in simultaneous service in the last decade on several occasions. The following have been identified by name thus far in various Marvel Universe publications:

 Luxor – Not yet seen. A class prototype.
 Hermes – Allegedly scuttled after being hijacked by the Red Skull.
 Argus – A Luxor-class Helicarrier.
 Behemoth – Specially designed Helicarrier commanded by Dum Dum Dugan for use against Godzilla in the 24-issue comic series Godzilla, King of the Monsters. First appearance was in issue #6 (January 1978). Destroyed by S.H.I.E.L.D. in an attempt to neutralize an attack by Amadeus Cho in Incredible Hercules #115.
 Black Hawk – Destroyed in action against a HYDRA-Hand alliance of forces in Wolverine: Agent of S.H.I.E.L.D. Further details on these events are depicted in The Irredeemable Ant-Man #1-2. Dark Reign: Elektra #1-5 gives more details, such as it having landed on a small Arkansas town.
 Alpha – First mentioned by name in New Avengers #4. Also shown in the video game Marvel: Ultimate Alliance as S.H.I.E.L.D. Helicarrier UNN Alpha.
 Pericles III – Punisher War Journal vol. 2, #1.
 Pericles V – Infiltrated by the vampiric Order of Tyrana and scuttled by Blade in Blade vol. 3, #1.
 Samuel Sawyer – First appearance in Iron Man: Hypervelocity #3. Named for Nick Fury's World War II-era commanding officer in the United States Army.
 Iliad – First shown in Secret Warriors #4. Named in Secret Warriors #17. Another Helicarrier of a different design is operating under that name as of Secret Avengers v.2 # 1.
 Argonaut – First shown in Secret Warriors #4. Named in Secret Warriors #17.
 Prometheus – Originally intended as Norman Osborn's H.A.M.M.E.R. flagship, the Prometheus was stolen from a secret U.S. facility in the Sonoran Desert by a rogue faction of S.T.R.I.K.E. during the 2011 "Fear Itself" storyline.
 Tempest – Named and destroyed shortly after launch with two thousand crew aboard by the Electric Ghost in Winter Soldier v.1 # 17.
 Hercules – Capable of operating in submarine mode. Described as Constellation-class. First shown and named in Wolverine v.5 # 5–6.
 Constellation – Class namesake. Existence implied by dialogue in Wolverine v.5 # 6.
 Odyssey – First shown and named in Captain America: Living Legend # 1.
 Pericles – First shown and named in X-Force v.4 # 7. Already decommissioned and abandoned by S.H.I.E.L.D. under unrevealed circumstances in its first appearance, and taken over as a base by X-Force. The name has since been transferred to a "Battlecarrier", which first appeared in Agents of S.H.I.E.L.D. # 1.
 Bellerophon – First named in New Avengers v.4 # 14. Design mimics those appearing in the Marvel Cinematic Universe films and television series.
 Douglass – First named in U.S.Avengers # 2. May be named for Frederick Douglass.

After Iron Man replaced Maria Hill as Director of S.H.I.E.L.D., he designed a new class of Helicarrier whose red and gold design resembles the Iron Man Armor. Hill called it Helicarrier Gold, but Stark considered it The Helicarrier. This helicarrier was severely damaged and crashed by the Red Hulk, and subsequently commandeered by the Intelligencia (the covert operation of evil super-geniuses that employed the Red Hulk), who renamed it the "Hellcarrier".

The main S.H.I.E.L.D. Helicarrier is subsequently disabled by a computer virus unleashed by a Skrull agent posing as Edwin Jarvis, as part of the Secret Invasion. It lands in the Bermuda Triangle. Most of the staff are revealed to be Skrulls. The craft is destroyed by Maria Hill.

It is not yet known what criteria S.H.I.E.L.D. uses to name its Helicarriers.

S.H.I.E.L.D.'s replacement agency, H.A.M.M.E.R., has decommissioned the surviving Helicarriers, with three of them — including the Iliad and the Argonaut — being stolen by Nick Fury. H.A.M.M.E.R. subsequently commissioned at least one new carrier to Norman Osborn's specifications, which was destroyed over Broxton, Oklahoma, during the Siege of Asgard.

According to intel gathered by Livewires, 5 Helicarriers are known to have been wrecked, though this data is out of date as several more have been lost since.

In the pages of Avengers Undercover, it is shown that the S.H.I.E.L.D. Helicarrier Circe has employed some necromancers as part of its personnel as seen when they jam Nico Minoru's spells.

Reception

Accolades 

 In 2019, CBR.com ranked the Helicarrier 10th in their "10 Most Iconic Superhero Hideouts In Marvel Comics" list.
 In 2021, CBR.com ranked the Helicarrier 7th in their "10 Most Important Vehicles In The Marvel Universe" list.
 In 2022, Sportskeeda included the Helicarrier in their "10 best vehicles in comic books" list.
 In 2022, CBR.com ranked the Helicarrier 3rd in their "10 Coolest Vehicles In Marvel Comics" list.

Other versions

Marvel NOW
In the epilogue of issue #25 of New Avengers, circa the year 1968, Howard Stark (father of Tony Stark, aka Iron Man), is seen giving Colonel Nick Fury of S.H.I.E.L.D. the hard sell of his newly designed Helicarrier.

Ultimate Marvel
The Ultimate Universe deals with Helicarriers differently. Whereas on Marvel's Earth-616 is implied that S.H.I.E.L.D. (a United Nations Task Force) only has a handful of Helicarriers in operation, in the Ultimate Universe, S.H.I.E.L.D. is depicted as a United States-operated military organization and is shown to have dozens of carriers, some even replacing retired conventional aircraft carriers like the USS Constellation. The engines that keep the carrier aloft were designed by Tony Stark and were modular enough to be used in a space shuttle by the Ultimate Fantastic Four. These "Ultimate Universe" Helicarriers generally seem to be smaller than the Earth-616 versions, and have a more conventional aircraft carrier shape, but are far more plentiful. In Ultimate Avengers Vs New Ultimates #4, Nick Fury reveals that Hank Pym was the one who conceived and designed the Helicarriers.

In other media

Television
 The S.H.I.E.L.D. Helicarrier appears in the Spider-Man and His Amazing Friends episode "Mission: Save the Guardstar."
 The S.H.I.E.L.D. Helicarrier also appears in Spider-Man: The Animated Series. Besides being the S.H.I.E.L.D. headquarters, it also served as a prison for high-risk individuals, such as the Chameleon. It was eventually destroyed by Electro.
 Another version of the S.H.I.E.L.D. Helicarrier appears in the final episode of X-Men: Evolution.
 A version of the Helicarrier appears in The Super Hero Squad Show, and serves as the base of operations for the Super Hero Squad. It is usually piloted by S.H.I.E.L.D. leader Ms. Marvel, who reluctantly allowed the Squad to move in. Since then, it has been nearly destroyed on two occasions.
 The Helicarrier was featured in the Iron Man: Armored Adventures episode "Technovore", but instead of propellers keeping it aloft, it has jet engines (designed by Howard Stark).
 S.H.I.E.L.D. Helicarriers appear in the animated series The Avengers: Earth's Mightiest Heroes.
 The Helicarrier appears in Ultimate Spider-Man. In season 1, it served as the training area for Spider-Man's team. The Helicarrier also functioned as a headquarters and prison equipped with specially designed cells for supervillains. In the season finale, "Rise of the Goblin", the Helicarrier is destroyed by Green Goblin and crashes. It was also revealed that Power Man, Iron Fist, Nova, and White Tiger lived on the Helicarrier. In season 2 episode, "The Man-Wolf", the Helicarrier is rebuilt as the more versatile Tri-Carrier which can divide into three different ships: an Astro-Carrier (a space variant of the Helicarrier), an Aqua-Carrier (an underwater variant of the Helicarrier), and a Strato-Carrier (the central component). In the season finale, "Ultimate", Green Goblin salvages the Helicarrier as his "Hell-Carrier" as part of his plot to use Goblin Gas to turn everyone into Goblins. In the end, Green Goblin self-destructs the Hellcarrier in order to get it out of the Tricarrier's tractor beam. In the season 3 episode, "Agent Venom", S.H.I.E.L.D. has Agent Venom kept on the Tri-Carrier so that Nick Fury can have the latest young superheroes reside there, only to be moved to the Triskellion in "New Warriors" and "S.H.I.E.L.D. Academy". In the season 4 episode, "Hydra Attacks", Doctor Octopus uses one of his miniature Octo-Bots to hack into Swarm's nanites where it starts rebuilding the Tri-Carrier as HYDRA Island. The Tri-Carrier was eventually destroyed when Scarlet Spider sacrifices himself to stop Hydra Island. 
 The S.H.I.E.L.D. Tri-Carrier appears in the Avengers Assemble episode "Bring On the Bad Guys". The Avengers apprehend Red Skull and have him incarcerated on the Tri-Carrier. It is hijacked by the Cabal. After the Cabal gets away, it is revealed that they stole the special prison that is holding Hyperion. Nighthawk was also incarcerated there in season 2 until Hyperion busted him out. It made its final appearance after Ultron tries to ground the Helicarrier but ultimately was defeated by Iron Man.
 The Helicarrier from Marvel's The Avengers (2012) makes a flashback appearance in the episode "Scars" in the second season of Agents of S.H.I.E.L.D.. After being alluded to throughout the season as "Theta Protocol", the episode reveals that Phil Coulson and Fury discovered that the ship had survived HYDRA's attack and secretly used Coulson's position and resources as Director of S.H.I.E.L.D. to repair and maintain the Helicarrier for use in a grave world emergency as it later is in Sokovia during the events of Avengers: Age of Ultron (2015). Additionally, portions of the Helicarrier battle from Captain America: The Winter Soldier appeared in a newscast Coulson was watching in a season two episode. The Helicarrier makes a cameo appearance during the series finale, "What We're Fighting For".
 A Helicarrier makes a brief cameo in Loki's "Journey into Mystery" in the Void at the end of time. This Helicarrier bears a HYDRA logo.

Film

 The first live-action incarnation of the Helicarrier appeared in the 1998 television film Nick Fury: Agent of S.H.I.E.L.D.
 Several of S.H.I.E.L.D.'s Helicarriers appear in the animated film Ultimate Avengers. They are destroyed by a trio of Chitauri vessels.
 The Helicarrier appears in films of the Marvel Cinematic Universe specifically based on the Ultimate Marvel version in terms of appearance.
 The Helicarrier shown in Marvel's The Avengers (2012) has two stacked carrier decks, has a hull number of 64, and has optical camouflage capabilities. The Helicarrier was designed by Nathan Schroeder, modeled and animated by Industrial Light and Magic, but both ILM and Weta Digital collaborated on the Helicarrier attack sequence. The hull number may be referencing the former USS Constellation.
 In Captain America: The Winter Soldier (2014), Hydra, which had secretly embedded itself within S.H.I.E.L.D. from its founding, plans to initiate Project Insight, in which three next-generation Helicarriers linked to spy satellites will be poised to kill all people it deems to be threats. These Helicarriers feature several improvements from the one seen in Marvel's The Avengers, most notably the addition of battleship-sized guns and repulsor engines designed by Tony Stark. All three are destroyed when Captain America, Falcon, and Maria Hill reprogram their targeting systems to fire on each other, one of which slams into the Triskelion before exploding and sinking into the Potomac.
In Avengers: Age of Ultron (2015), the original Helicarrier is used by Nick Fury and the remnants of S.H.I.E.L.D. to help the Avengers evacuate citizens of Sokovia from an airborne chunk of a city lifted by Ultron. Fury states that he "pulled her out of mothballs", which is later elaborated on in the Agents of S.H.I.E.L.D. television series where Phil Coulson and his new iteration of S.H.I.E.L.D. repaired the Helicarrier under the project name "Theta Protocol".
In Deadpool (2016), produced by 20th Century Fox, a decommissioned Helicarrier, found in a scrapyard is used as a setting for the final battle. It is not identified onscreen by that name however due to rights issues with Disney/Marvel Studios which at the time hadn't bought out most of Fox's film and TV assets, including the X-Men, Fantastic Four and Deadpool.

Video games
 The Helicarrier is one of the main locations in the game Marvel: Ultimate Alliance. The Helicarrier featured is referenced in the opening cinematic by Nick Fury as "S.H.I.E.L.D. Helicarrier UNN Alpha". After the Alpha is damaged from the Masters of Evil's attack, Fury uses Stark Tower as a base for his superhero allies that were recruited to stop Doctor Doom's Masters of Evil. This version also has jet engines replacing propellers.
 The Helicarrier appears in the game Ultimate Spider-Man. It appears after Venom is unlocked, and when the player causes enough havoc in free roam to merit flying S.H.I.E.L.D. troopers.
 The Helicarrier works as a headquarters of sorts in the game Spider-Man: Friend or Foe.
 A Helicarrier appears multiple times in the game Spider-Man: Web of Shadows. It is destroyed at the end of the game following the Venom monster's defeat. In the PSP and PS2 version, Spider-Man ends up on the Helicarrier after his fight with the Tinkerer and discovers that the Helicarrier is infested with Symbiotes. After Spider-Man defeats Jackal, the Helicarrier crashes to the ground.
 The Helicarrier makes a brief appearance in the game Marvel: Ultimate Alliance 2. In the first cut scene, Captain America escapes from the Helicarrier when he wouldn't support the Superhuman Registration Act. In a later cut scene, the Helicarrier was over the chemical plant owned by Stark Industries in a Pro-Registration plot to get the Anti-Registration forces to join up with them.
 The Helicarrier appears in Spider-Man: Shattered Dimensions. In the last Ultimate segment, Carnage successfully infects the Hellicarrier with his spawn and causes it to crash land towards Spider-Man's location, who must get to safety before he gets crushed.
 The Helicarrier appears in the game Iron Man 2. The preview video for the game reveals that Tony Stark was the one who built it. It is shown as the S.H.I.E.L.D. base throughout the game, but also as a weapon. At one point, it is attacked by A.I.M. forces. However, they are defeated by the combined forces of Iron Man and War Machine. At the end of the game, it is destroyed on purpose when it crashes into the giant Ultimo.
 The Helicarrier appears as one of the stages in the game Marvel vs. Capcom 3: Fate of Two Worlds and its Ultimate rerelease.
 The flight deck of the Helicarrier serves as a hub in Marvel: Avengers Alliance.
 The Helicarrier serves as the main headquarters in Lego Marvel Super Heroes. It is shown hovering over Manhattan.
 The Helicarrier serves as a hub in Lego Marvel's Avengers.
 The Helicarrier makes a brief appearance in Lego Marvel Super Heroes 2, wherein it is vaporized by Kang the Conqueror upon his arrival in New York.
 Helicarriers appear in the smartphone turn-based RPG Marvel Strike Force as battlegrounds for alliance-versus-alliance battles.  Each alliance, comprising numerous players, reserves defense squads to protect its own Helicarrier while sending others to attack the rival Helicarrier.
 A Helicarrier called the Chimaera appears in the beginning of the action-adventure game Marvel's Avengers, developed by Crystal Dynamics and published by Square Enix.
 The Helicarrier appears in Iron Man VR. This version was created by Stark Industries and was the last project Tony Stark sold to S.H.I.E.L.D. before his company stopped manufacturing weapons. During the game's story, the Helicarrier comes under attack two times: once by Ghost and her drones, and a second time by the Living Laser, both of whom are thwarted by Iron Man.
 The Helicarrier appears in Fortnite Battle Royale Chapter 2, Season 4, titled "Nexus War" by Epic Games.
 The Helicarrier appears in the digital collectible card game Marvel Snap.

Novels
 The 1998 Iron Man graphic novel Crash, which takes place in the future, introduces a S.H.I.E.L.D. "Levicarrier", which is held aloft by some form of anti-gravity mechanism.

See also
 Airborne aircraft carrier
 Cloudbase
 Fictional airborne aircraft carriers
 Sky Captain and the World of Tomorrow

References

External links
 Marvel Comics' official profile on the Helicarriers
 Helicarriers' profile and story

S.H.I.E.L.D.
Marvel Comics vehicles
Fictional airships
Fictional aircraft carriers
Fictional seaplanes